Evalea is a genus of sea snails, marine gastropod mollusks in the family Pyramidellidae, the pyrams and their allies.

Evalea was assigned to Odostomia by Martin (1904); to Heterostrophia by Sepkoski (2002)  and to Pyramidellidae by Wienrich and Janssen (2007)

Species
Species within the genus Evalea include:
 Evalea amchitkana (Dall & Bartsch, 1909)
 Evalea carinae van Aartsen & Corgan, 1996
 Evalea eclecta (Pilsbry, 1918)
 Evalea elegans (A. Adams, 1860)
 Evalea emeryi (Bartsch, 1955)
 Evalea fernandina (Bartsch, 1927)
 Evalea liricincta (Suter, 1908)
 Evalea plana Laws, 1941
 Evalea propria Laws, 1941
 Evalea ryclea (Bartsch, 1927)
 Evalea sabulosa (Suter, 1908)
 Evalea stocki Jong & Coomans, 1988
 Evalea waikikiensis (Pilsbry, 1918)

The following species were brought into synonymy:
 Evalea alleryi F. Nordsieck, 1972 : synonym of Ondina scandens (Monterosato, 1884)
 Evalea exigua F. Nordsieck, 1972: synonym of Ondina vitrea (Brusina, 1866)
 Evalea peasei (Dautzenberg & Bouge, 1933): synonym of Evalea eclecta (Pilsbry, 1918)
 Evalea pocahontasae Henderson, J.B. & P. Bartsch, 1914: synonym of Odostomia pocahontasae Henderson & Bartsch, 1914
 Evalea scandens (Monterosato, 1884): synonym of Ondina scandens (Monterosato, 1884)
 Evalea semiornata Folin, L. de, 1872: synonym of Ondina warreni (Thompson, W., 1845)
 Evalea spiridionae F. Nordsieck, 1972: synonym of Ondina vitrea (Brusina, 1866)
 Evalea subulata F. Nordsieck, 1972: synonym of Ondina scandens (Monterosato, 1884)

References

External links
 To ITIS
 To World Register of Marine Species
 Miocene Gastropods and Biostratigraphy of the Kern River Area, California; United States Geological Survey Professional Paper 642 

Pyramidellidae